Nicholas Nestor "Kola" Kwariani (January 16, 1903 – February 27, 1980), known by the ring name Nick the Wrestler, was a Georgian professional wrestler and chess player.

Early life
Kwariani was born in Kutaisi, the son of Nestor and Caserines (née Kesaria) Kwariani.

Professional wrestling career
Kwariani had been a Greco-Roman champion in Europe before the war and a professional wrestler in the United States afterward. He participated in many wrestling matches, most famously with "Mr. America" Gene Stanlee, which was featured as one of the top 10 matches of the wrestling Golden Era in the U.S. From 1959 to 1960, he coached Antonino Rocca. From 1959 to 1962, he closely worked with Bruno Sammartino.

Chess career
According to Chess Review magazine, Kwariani was the only chess-playing professional wrestler in the U.S. In the 1950s, he was an active player at the Chess and Checker Club in New York City, also known as "The Flea House".

Other media
Kwariani had a role in Stanley Kubrick's 1956 film The Killing, in the role of chess-playing wrestler Maurice Oboukhoff, who is hired to start a fight to create a diversion during a heist. A picture of Kwariani, Kubrick, and Sterling Hayden appeared on the cover of Chess Review magazine in March 1956.

Death
In February 1980, while entering the Chess and Checker Club, Kwariani was seriously injured after being assaulted by a group of teenagers. The incident was later described by Samuel Sloan: "Nick came in the downstairs entrance one evening when about five black youths were leaving. They bumped into each other. Words were exchanged. Nick never took any guff from anybody and soon he was engaged in a fight with all five black kids at once. Nick probably could still have handled any one or two of them, but five were too many. Nick was beaten." He was then taken to a hospital, where he died at age 77. He was predeceased by his wife, Sidonia (Novak) Kwariani.

Filmography
The Killing (1956) - Maurice Oboukhoff

References

External links

1903 births
1980 deaths
Georgian
American chess players
Professional wrestlers from Georgia (country)
American male professional wrestlers
Russian male professional wrestlers
Male sport wrestlers from Georgia (country)
Sportspeople from Kutaisi
20th-century American male actors
20th-century chess players
American murder victims
 deaths by beating in the United States
 1980 murders in the United States